The 1961 Toronto Argonauts finished in third place in the Eastern Conference with a 7–6–1 record. They appeared in the Eastern Finals.

Preseason
The Argonauts hosted the NFL's St. Louis Cardinals at CNE Stadium on August 2 in the third of three interleague games hosted in Toronto and lost 36–7.

Regular season

Standings

Schedule

Postseason

Awards and honours
None

References

Toronto Argonauts seasons
1961 Canadian Football League season by team